Legend Lake is a census-designated place (CDP) in Menominee County, Wisconsin, Wisconsin, United States, on the Menominee Indian Reservation. The population was 1,670 at the 2020 census.

Geography
Legend Lake is located at  (44.896811, -88.563718).

According to the United States Census Bureau, the CDP has a total area of 20.5 square miles (53.1 km2), of which, 16.8 square miles (43.6 km2) of it is land and 3.7 square miles (9.5 km2) of it (17.93%) is water.

Demographics

2020 census
As of the census of 2020, the population was 1,670. The racial makeup of the CDP was 71.0% Native American, 25.1% White, 0.1% Asian, 0.1% from other races, and 3.7% from two or more races. Ethnically, the population was 3.7% Hispanic or Latino of any race.

2000 census
As of the census of 2000, there were 1,533 people, 538 households, and 401 families residing in the CDP. The population density was 91.0 people per square mile (35.1/km2). There were 1,232 housing units at an average density of 73.1/sq mi (28.2/km2). The racial makeup of the CDP was 28.11% White, 0.07% African American, 70.25% Native American, 0.59% from other races, and 0.98% from two or more races. Hispanic or Latino of any race were 3.13% of the population.

There were 538 households, out of which 28.8% had children under the age of 18 living with them, 52.0% were married couples living together, 15.1% had a female householder with no husband present, and 25.3% were non-families. 20.1% of all households were made up of individuals, and 7.4% had someone living alone who was 65 years of age or older. The average household size was 2.85 and the average family size was 3.20.

In the CDP, the population was spread out, with 30.6% under the age of 18, 7.3% from 18 to 24, 21.9% from 25 to 44, 27.2% from 45 to 64, and 13.0% who were 65 years of age or older. The median age was 38 years. For every 100 females, there were 93.1 males. For every 100 females age 18 and over, there were 94.2 males.

The median income for a household in the CDP was $38,393, and the median income for a family was $38,333. Males had a median income of $25,833 versus $23,750 for females. The per capita income for the CDP was $14,512. About 12.6% of families and 17.5% of the population were below the poverty line, including 26.9% of those under age 18 and 2.7% of those age 65 or over.

Property Owners Association
The Legend Lake Property Owners Association, or LLPOA for short, is the land and property owner group for Legend Lake and the surrounding areas. The main office for the LLPOA is located on Old South Branch Road, on the east side of the lake. This building is also a community gathering place for property owners, including a boat/watercraft launch site for members and visitors. Property owners have access to many areas including, beach clubs and compost sites. The LLPOA has a quarterly magizine called Smoke Signals Along the Lake. This includes new owners and/or members and announcements.

See also
 List of census-designated places in Wisconsin

References

External links

 Legend Lake Community
 Legend Lake Technologies
 Legend Lake Campgrounds
 Legend Lake Property Owner's Association and Protection & Rehab District

Census-designated places in Menominee County, Wisconsin
Census-designated places in Wisconsin